Salek Chowdhury is a Bangladesh Nationalist Party politician and the former Member of Parliament of Naogaon-1.

Career
Chowdhury was elected to parliament from Naogaon-1 as a Bangladesh Nationalist Party candidate in 1996 and 2001.

References

Bangladesh Nationalist Party politicians
Living people
7th Jatiya Sangsad members
8th Jatiya Sangsad members
Year of birth missing (living people)